Chantal Ladesou (born 5 May 1948) is a French actress and comedian.

Personal life 
Ladesou met her husband Michel Ansault and with whom she had three children, two boys, Alix (who died in a car accident), Julien and a daughter, the actress Clémence Ansault. Her son Julien Ansault is married to Pauline Lefèvre.

Career 
She was revealed to the public in participating to the TV Show La Classe in 1987.

Theater

Filmography

References

External links

1948 births
French film actresses
Living people
20th-century French actresses
21st-century French actresses
People from Roubaix